Sebastiano-schaueria is a monotypic genus of flowering plants belonging to the family Acanthaceae. The only known species is Sebastiano-schaueria oblongata.

Its native range is south eastern Brazil.

The genus name of Sebastiano-schaueria is in honour of Sebastian Schauer (1814–1850), German gardener and botanist at botanical gardens in present-day Wrocław and Berlin. The Latin specific epithet of oblongata refers to oblangatus meaning oblong.
Both the genus and the species were first described and published in C.F.P.von Martius & auct. suc. (eds.), Fl. Bras. Vol.9 on pages 158-159 in 1847.
The genus is recognized by the United States Department of Agriculture and the Agricultural Research Service, but they do not list any known species.

References

Acanthaceae
Acanthaceae genera
Monotypic Lamiales genera
Plants described in 1847
Flora of Southeast Brazil